Rose Windows was a psychedelic rock band from Seattle, Washington, formed by songwriter Chris Cheveyo in the fall of 2010 in the Central District of Seattle, Washington. Many of the band's members were friends of Cheveyo. The band consists of Rabia Shaheen Qazi (vocals), David Davila (piano and organ), Nils Petersen (electric guitar), Pat Schowe (drums), Richie Rekow (drums) and Veronica Dye (flute).

The Sun Dogs

Label-less at the time, Rose Windows began making plans for their first album. The band sought out local producer Randall Dunn based on his past success with the band Earth. Other local musicians were later brought on board to add harp, pedal steel, viola, and cello.

On June 25, 2013, Rose Windows released their debut album, The Sun Dogs, for Sub Pop Records.

Cheveyo describes The Sun Dogs as being about “the everyday blues that capitalism and its hit man, religion, bring on all of us.” More specifically, he sees The Sun Dogs as an acknowledgment of the circular nature of the rat race, learning to accept the evil in the world, taking joy wherever we can, and ultimately disavowing traditions of exploitation and violence.

The Sun Dogs contains elements of folk rock, psychedelic rock, Persian, Indian, and Eastern European music.

Rose Windows

In February 2015, the band announced that their self-titled second album would be released on May 5. Sessions were recorded during the autumn of 2014 in Bogalusa, Louisiana, with Randall Dunn returning as producer. The band premiered a new song "Glory, Glory" (the first single) and also announced that they would be performing at Levitation 2015 (Austin Psych Fest) and Sasquatch.

On March 30, the band announced via Facebook that they would not be continuing on as a musical group, and all future appearances cancelled.

Personnel
 Chris Cheveyo – lead guitar/composer
 Rabia Shaheen Qazi – lead vocalist
 Richie Rekow – bass/1st male vocalist
 Nils Petersen – rhythm guitar/2nd male vocalist
 Pat Schowe – drums
 David Davila – piano/organ
 Veronica Dye – flute

References

Sub Pop artists
Musical groups from Seattle
American psychedelic rock music groups
Musical groups established in 2010
Musical groups disestablished in 2015
2010 establishments in Washington (state)